This is a list of newspapers currently published in The Gambia.

Daily
The Daily Observer
The Point

Biweekly
Foroyaa

News websites
Freedom Newspaper – online
The Standard – online
The Daily News – online

See also
 List of newspapers

References

External links

Gambia, The
Newspapers published in the Gambia
Gambia communications-related lists